Shelby Young is an American actress. She is known for her roles on American Horror Story, Days of Our Lives, The Social Network and the Star Wars franchise.

Early life 
Young was born in Florida to a Jewish family.
Young always wanted to be an actor. As a child, she loved performing for her friends and family, and performed in pageantry, theater and commercials while living there.

As she has grown, her career focus has shifted to voice over and motion capture acting for animation and video.

Career 
Young's first television role was in 2001 when she played the role of Sue Ann Butler on the Showtime series Going to California. In 2002, Young played Stephanie in the unaired pilot for LazyTown. From 2005 to 2008, she had a recurring role as Jennifer on Everybody Hates Chris, and from 2009 to 2011, she recurred on Days of Our Lives as Kinsey. Young has also had guest starring roles on the MTV series Awkward (2011), Ghost Whisperer (2006), and Freddie (2006). She then co-starred in the Universal Studios film Wild Child (2008). In 2010, Young played the role of KC in the film The Social Network.

In 2011, she had a recurring role as Leah on American Horror Story: Murder House, the first season in the anthology series. In addition, Young played the role of Rose in The Midnight Game, which was released in 2013 by Anchor Bay Entertainment.

Young starred in the found-footage horror film Nightlight; the film was released in a limited release and through video on demand on March 27, 2015. That same year, she appeared in the film The House Sitter opposite Kate Ashfield. She also starred in the horror-thriller film A Haunting in Cawdor, which was released in the United Kingdom on October 9, 2015, and in the United States in March 2016.

As a voice actress, Young is known in the Star Wars galaxy for voicing multiple characters across their animation titles and video games. Her most notable role may be voicing Princess Leia Organa in projects like Lego Star Wars: The Skywalker Saga, the Disney Channel series Star Wars Forces of Destiny and the Disney Plus TV special, Lego Star Wars: Summer Vacation. Young is also known by video game fans for her work as Soph Blazkowicz, whom she brought to life through both voice and movement via MoCap, in Wolfenstein: Youngblood as one of the first-ever playable female characters in the long-standing franchise. Young's resume includes other AAA franchises such as Call of Duty, Battlefield, Final Fantasy and Dead Rising 3, where she voiced and provided MoCap for the lead role of Annie. Young currently recurs as Rayna on Nickelodeon's, Baby Shark's Big Show!, as Captain Bragg and others on the Disney Plus series Star Wars The Bad Batch. Shelby can also be heard in recent hit releases God of War: Ragnarök as Skuld and Horizon Call of the Mountain as Hami.

Young has recently started doing voice impressions on TikTok, YouTube and other social media platforms and has amassed a following of over 4 million users between the platforms.

Filmography

Live-action

Film

Television

Voice acting

Film

Television

Video games

References

External links

Living people
American child actresses
American film actresses
American soap opera actresses
American television actresses
American voice actresses
21st-century American actresses
1992 births
Jewish American actresses